Larochea is a genus of minute slug-like sea snails, marine gastropod molluscs in the family Larocheidae.

Species
Species within the genus Larochea include:
Larochea miranda Finlay, 1927
Larochea scitula Marshall, 1993
Larochea secunda Powell, 1937
Larochea spirata Geiger & B.A. Marshall, 2012

References
 Powell A. W. B., New Zealand Mollusca, William Collins Publishers Ltd, Auckland, New Zealand 1979 
 Oxfordjournals.org info
 Geiger D.L. (2012) Monograph of the little slit shells. Volume 1. Introduction, Scissurellidae. pp. 1-728. Volume 2. Anatomidae, Larocheidae, Depressizonidae, Sutilizonidae, Temnocinclidae. pp. 729-1291. Santa Barbara Museum of Natural History Monographs Number 7

Larocheidae
Gastropods of New Zealand
Taxa named by Harold John Finlay